Hannu Mäkelä (born 18 August 1943 in Helsinki, Finland) is an author of more than 100 books in Finnish: novels, collections of short stories, edited anthologies and children's books. Hannu Mäkelä is known for his books for children in many countries around the world, especially the popular "Mr. Hoo" (Mr. Boo) series.

Works

Novels
Traveling all the time (1965)

External links
Mäkelä's Website 

1943 births
Living people
Writers from Helsinki
Finnish male poets
Finnish-language poets
Finnish male novelists
Finnish male short story writers
Finnish short story writers
Finnish children's writers
Finlandia Prize winners
20th-century Finnish novelists
20th-century Finnish poets
20th-century male writers
Recipients of the Eino Leino Prize